James Dinsmore (born c. 1771, died 1830) was an Irish carpenter, known for his work while serving Thomas Jefferson. He was responsible for the training of John Hemings, half-brother to Sally Hemings.

Dinsmore was born around 1771 or 1772 in Ireland and he emigrated to the United States during the late 1700s, where he became a naturalized American citizen on June 5, 1798. He was hired by Jefferson in Philadelphia, who paid for Dinsmore's tools and travel expenses to Charlottesville, Virginia. While at Monticello Dinsmore worked on the plantation's interior and was responsible for much of the house's woodwork. After 1809 Dinsmore left Monticello to work on James Madison's plantation Montpelier, where he and John Neilson worked on the house's expansion. Dinsmore also helped build Estouteville and several of the buildings for the University of Virginia, where he built three pavilions and fourteen dormitories.

Dinsmore died on May 13, 1830 after he drowned in the Rivanna River. His gravesite is unknown, but is likely in or near Charlottesville, Virginia.

References

1770s births
1830 deaths
Thomas Jefferson
Irish carpenters
Irish emigrants to the United States
Deaths by drowning in the United States